Epidiopteryx bipunctella is a moth in the family Xyloryctidae, and the only species in the genus Epidiopteryx. The genus and species were both described by Hans Rebel in 1916 and are found in Sudan.

References

Xyloryctidae
Xyloryctidae genera
Monotypic moth genera
Taxa named by Hans Rebel